Raisabad (also Romanized as Ra’īsābād) is a village in Dabuy-ye Jonubi Rural District, Dabudasht District, Amol County, Mazandaran Province, Iran. At the 2006 census, its population was 326, in 89 families.

References 

Populated places in Amol County